Jakub Więzik is a Polish footballer who plays as a forward for Spójnia Landek. Besides Spójnia, he has played for Śląsk Wrocław, Polkowice, ŁKS Łódź, Pogoń Siedlce, Carl Zeiss Jena, Meuselwitz, Tatran Prešov and Železiarne Podbrezová.

Personal life
He is a son of a Polish footballer Grzegorz Więzik.

References

External links
 
 

1991 births
Living people
Polish footballers
Polish expatriate footballers
Association football forwards
Sportspeople from Bielsko-Biała
People from Bielsko-Biała
Śląsk Wrocław players
KS Polkowice players
FC Carl Zeiss Jena players
ŁKS Łódź players
Podbeskidzie Bielsko-Biała players
1. FC Tatran Prešov players
FK Železiarne Podbrezová players
ZFC Meuselwitz players
MKP Pogoń Siedlce players
Ekstraklasa players
I liga players
II liga players
Slovak Super Liga players
Regionalliga players
Expatriate footballers in Germany
Expatriate footballers in Slovakia
Polish expatriate sportspeople in Germany
Polish expatriate sportspeople in Slovakia